Synersaga mondulkiriensis is a moth in the family Lecithoceridae. It is found in Cambodia.

The wingspan is 17–18 mm. The forewings are covered with dark fuscous scales throughout. There are two well developed blackish discal spots. The hindwings are broader than the forewings. They are pale brownish orange.

Etymology
The species name is derived from Mondulkiri, the type locality.

References

Moths described in 2012
mondulkiriensis